Sar Godar or Sargodar may refer to:
 Sargodar-e Kalatu, Hormozgan Province
 Sar Godar, Jiroft, Kerman Province
 Sar Godar, Rigan, Kerman Province
 Sar Godar, Razavi Khorasan